"Inferno" is a song by Filipino-American social media personality Bella Poarch and American musician and producer Sub Urban. It was released through Warner Records on August 13, 2021 as the second single from Poarch's debut extended play Dolls (2022) and the lead single from Sub Urban's debut studio album Hive (2022).  The song follows the May 2021 release of Poarch's debut single "Build a Bitch".

Background and composition 
In early August 2021, Poarch announced she would release a new single on August 13. The announcement was accompanied by a 30-second video teaser featuring cameo appearances by producer Sub Urban along with Twitch streamers Adin Ross, Disguised Toast, Ludwig, and TommyInnit.

Production 
"Inferno" was described as "another dark pop offering" from Poarch, featuring "heavy beats and the chilling sound of creepy children singing". The track also includes "theatrical and classical elements and a hint of tango" with lyrics about Poarch's "troubled past".

Music video 
In a statement, Poarch included a trigger warning for the music video. She wrote, "As a victim of sexual assault, this song and video mean a lot to me. This is something I haven't been ready to share with you just yet. It's very hard for me to talk about. But I'm ready now. I decided to express myself by creating a song and video with Sub Urban based on how I wished my experience went. It's a fantasy I wish was true. I'm looking forward to sharing this with you all." The video takes place in a Hollywood glamor-themed hotel in which Poarch is drugged by two men and pulled into an elevator. Upon entering the elevator, she develops superpowers and tortures the men, whilst Sub Urban, a bartender, makes sure nobody sees.  She is later revealed to be the devil herself, with Sub Urban as Virgil, who takes the offending men through the 9 Circles of Hell by Dante’s Inferno. The music video includes cameos from LilyPichu, Valkyrae, Adin Ross, Disguised Toast, Ludwig Ahgren, Pokimane, TommyInnit, CouRageJD, Ivana Alawi, and Bretman Rock.

Charts

Weekly charts

Year-end charts

Certifications

References

2021 singles
2021 songs
Bella Poarch songs
Songs about sexual assault
Song recordings produced by Sub Urban (musician)
Songs written by Bella Poarch
Songs written by Sub Urban (musician)
Sub Urban (musician) songs
Warner Records singles